David Oh (born March 28, 1981) is an American professional golfer.

Oh was born in Los Angeles, California. He played college golf at the University of Southern California from 1999 to 2003.

Oh has played on the Japan Golf Tour since 2012 and won his first tournament at the 2014 Mitsui Sumitomo Visa Taiheiyo Masters.

Professional wins (2)

Japan Golf Tour wins (1)

Other wins (1)
2003 Long Beach Open

References

External links

American male golfers
USC Trojans men's golfers
PGA Tour golfers
Golfers from Los Angeles
American sportspeople of Korean descent
1983 births
Living people